The Scelba Cabinet was the 10th cabinet of the Italian Republic, that held office from 10 February 1954 to 6 July 1955, for a total of 511 days (or 1 year, 4 months and 26 days).

After the election of Giovanni Gronchi as new President of Italy, Scelba resigned as Prime Minister.

Government parties
The government was composed by the following parties:

Party breakdown
 Christian Democracy (DC): prime minister, 13 ministers and 30 undersecretaries
 Italian Democratic Socialist Party (PSDI): deputy prime minister, 3 ministers and 4 undersecretaries
 Italian Liberal Party (PLI): 3 ministers and 2 undersecretaries

Composition

References

Italian governments
1954 establishments in Italy
1955 disestablishments in Italy
Cabinets established in 1954
Cabinets disestablished in 1955